Svenska Cupen 1941 was the first season of the main Swedish football Cup. The competition was concluded on 26 October 1941 with the Final, held at Råsunda Stadium, Solna in Stockholms län. Helsingborgs IF won the final 3–1 against IK Sleipner before an attendance of 10,763 spectators.

First round

For other results see SFS-Bolletinen - Matcher i Svenska Cupen.

Second round
The 8 matches in this round were played on 27 July 1941.

Quarter-finals
The 4 matches in this round were played between 13 August and 17 August 1941.

Semi-finals
The semi-finals in this round were played on 14 September 1941.

Final
The final was played on 26 October 1941 at the Råsunda Stadium.

Footnotes

References 

1941
Cup
Sweden